Shkëlqim Troplini (1 October 1966 – 7 November 2020) was an Albanian wrestler who competed in the 1996 Summer Olympics.

Death
On 7 November 2020, Troplini died of COVID-19 at the age of 54, during the COVID-19 pandemic in Albania.

References

1966 births
2020 deaths
Albanian male sport wrestlers
Olympic wrestlers of Albania
Wrestlers at the 1996 Summer Olympics
Sportspeople from Durrës
Deaths from the COVID-19 pandemic in Albania
20th-century Albanian people
21st-century Albanian people